Donja Koritnica is a village in the municipality of Bela Palanka, Serbia. According to the 2002 census, the village has a population of  216 people.

References

Populated places in Pirot District